The WTA Nice Open is a defunct WTA Tour affiliated tennis tournament played in 1988. It was held at the Nice Lawn Tennis Club in Nice in France and played on outdoor clay courts.

Results

Singles

Doubles

References
 WTA Results Archive

 
Clay court tennis tournaments
Defunct tennis tournaments in France
Nice